The Ariel 3 was a tricycle moped produced by the BSA factory in the UK. The Ariel 3 was a sales flop whose £2M development cost  contributed significantly to the demise of BSA.

Even the Ariel 3's promotion was ill-conceived, the sales slogan being "Here it is - whatever it is!". Cohn Atkinson attributes its failure to a remote management at BSA who "didn't even like bikes" and who "made the most appalling decisions" on production and marketing.

Design
The engine was a Dutch Anker  2-stroke, situated between the rear wheels. The pressed-steel forward section of the frame, supported by torsion bars, could swivel to enable the rider to lean the vehicle into bends like a motorcycle. The front "fork" was a single-sided down tube with a rudimentary rubber block suspension. All three pressed steel wheels were interchangeable. Drive was to just one of the rear wheels, and only one of the rear wheels had a brake, a small drum item. There was a similar front drum brake. A true moped, the Ariel 3's engine was started by first pedalling and then releasing a decompressor trigger. The rider could assist the little motor on hills by pedalling. The six volt headlight was single beam, with no dip. There was no rear suspension.

See also
List of Ariel motorcycles

References

Mopeds
Ariel motorcycles
Motorcycles introduced in 1970
Two-stroke motorcycles